Island Harbour is a designated place in the Canadian province of Newfoundland and Labrador.

History 
Island Harbour was founded in 1864.

Geography 
Island Harbour is on Fogo Island in the Town of Fogo Island within Division No. 8.

Demographics 

See also 
List of communities in Newfoundland and Labrador
List of designated places in Newfoundland and Labrador

References 

Designated places in Newfoundland and Labrador